William Markowitz (February 8, 1907 in Melč, Austrian Silesia – October 10, 1998 in Pompano Beach, Florida) was an American astronomer, principally known for his work on the standardization of time.

His mother was visiting Melč near Vítkov in Austrian Silesia (now Czech Republic) when William was born. The Polish family emigrated to the U.S. in 1910 and settled in Chicago.

William earned his doctorate from the University of Chicago in 1931, under W.D. MacMillan. He taught at Pennsylvania State College before joining the United States Naval Observatory in 1936, working under Paul Sollenberger and Gerald Clemence in the time service department.

After having married Rosalyn Shulemson in 1943, Markowitz eventually became director of the department. He developed the ephemeris time scale, which had been adopted by the IAU in 1952 on a proposal formulated by Clemence in 1948, as an international time standard. He subsequently worked with Louis Essen in England to calibrate the newly developed atomic clocks in terms of the ephemeris second. The fundamental frequency of caesium atomic clocks, which they determined as 9,192,631,770 ± 20 Hz, was used to define the second internationally since 1967. At the International Astronomical Union (IAU) meeting in Dublin in 1955, he had proposed the system of distinguishing between variants of Universal Time, as UT0 (UT as directly observed), UT1 (reduced to invariable meridian by correcting to remove effect of polar motion) and UT2 (further corrected to remove (extrapolated) seasonal variation in earth rotation rate), a system which remains in some use today.

He served as President of the IAU commission on time from 1955 to 1961, and was active in the International Union of Geodesy and Geophysics, the American Geophysical Union, and the International Consultative Committee for the Definition of the Second.

After retiring from USNO in 1966, Markowitz served as professor of physics at Marquette University until 1972, and also held a post at Nova Southeastern University.

External links 
 US Navy obituary

American astronomers
Austro-Hungarian emigrants to the United States
American people of Polish descent
Polish Austro-Hungarians
Czech people of Polish descent
People from Opava District
People from Austrian Silesia
1907 births
1998 deaths